Ravens Amateur F.C. was an English association football club from Sheffield, South Yorkshire. The club competed in the FA Amateur Cup from 1924 to 1926, and won the South Yorkshire Amateur League in 1952.

References

Defunct football clubs in England
Defunct football clubs in South Yorkshire
South Yorkshire Amateur Football League